is a Japanese professional footballer who plays as a midfielder for J3 League newly promoted side, FC Osaka.

Club career
On 1 January 2013, Kiyomoto joined FC Gifu from Feyenoord on a free transfer. He made his debut on 10 March 2013, coming on as a 46th-minute substitute in a 4–0 loss to Vissel Kobe.

On 13 July 2022, Kiyomoto announcement officially transfer to JFL club, FC Osaka for during mid 2022 season.

Career statistics

Club
.

References

External links
Profile at Oita Trinita

	

1993 births
Living people
Association football people from Gifu Prefecture
Association football midfielders
Japanese footballers
K League 1 players
J2 League players
J3 League players
Japan Football League players
FC Gifu players
Oita Trinita players
J.League U-22 Selection players
Gangwon FC players
Fujieda MYFC players
FC Osaka players